A list of Slovene novels:

0-9
5 do 12h

A
Abadon (novel)
Alamut (1938 novel)
Angie
Aritmija (novel)
Ata je spet pijan

B
Balerina, balerina
Bela dama Devinska
Bobri (novel)
Boštjanov let

C
Čaj s kraljico
Camera obscura (novel)
Car brez zaklada
Ciklamen
Con brio (novel)
Čudovita potovanja Zajca Rona

D
Deseti brat
Devet fantov in eno dekle
Distorzija
Dnevnik Hiacinte Novak
Drejček in trije Marsovčki

F
Fantje iz gline
Filio ni doma
Finta v levo
Fužinski bluz

G
Gimnazijec (novel)
Gluhota (novel)
Gospodin Franjo
Grenki med
Grenko spoznanje

H
Hiša groze
Hiša Marije Pomočnice
Hiša na meji (novel)

I
Ivan Erazem Tatenbah (novel)
Izpred kongresa

J
Janov krik

K
Kapitanov ključ
Karfanaum ali As killed
Keopsova piramida (novel)
Kosmati predsednik
Kralj ropotajočih duhov (novel)
Kraljeva hči
Kri na dlaneh

L
Ledene magnolije
Leta milosti
Leteči mački
Ljubezen.si
Ljubezni Sinjebradca
Ljubezni tri in ena smrt
Ločil bom peno od valov

M
Med dvema stoloma
Menuet za kitaro
Mladost na stopnicah
Mlinarjev Janez: Slovenski junak ali uplemenitba Teharčanov
Modri e
Modrost starodavnega anka
Mojster nebeške lepote
Morje v času mrka
Mrtvo morje (novel)
Muriša

N
Na Žerinjah
Ninina pesnika dva
Norišnica

O
Obiskovalec
Objestnost
Od blizu
Od RTM do WTF
Odprava zelenega zmaja
Odveč srce
Otrok brez otroštva
Otroške stvari
Očeta Vincenca smrt

P
Pastorek (novel)
Petelinji zajtrk (novel)
Pod milim nebom
Pod svobodnim soncem
Popkorn (novel)
Pot (Zaplotnik)
Požganica
Predmestje (novel)
Prikrita harmonija
Princ zelenih sanj
Princeska z napako

R
Rheia
Rokovnjači

S
Saga o Karantaniji, Kralj Samo
Sarkofag (novel)
Se spominjaš Afrike?
Sedmi svet
Seks, ljubezen in to
Sekstant (novel)
Sence v očesu
Šesta knjiga sanj
Slepi potnik
Slovenski svetec in učitelj
Smeh za leseno pregrado
Šolen z brega
Srebro iz modre špilje
Sveti Pavel (novel)

T
Tango v svilenih coklah
Teden dni do polne lune
Telesni čuvaj (novel)
Tito, amor mijo
To noč sem jo videl
Tri (novel)
Triptih Agate Schwarzkobler
Trnovska mafija
Trnovska mafija drugič

Z
Zoo (novel)
Žarometi (novel)

 
Novels
Lists of novels